Change of the Century is an album by jazz saxophonist Ornette Coleman, released on Atlantic Records in May 1960. It sold very well from soon after its release. Recording sessions for the album took place on October 8 and 9, 1959, in New York City.

In the liner notes, Coleman stressed that the album was "a group effort," and wrote: "When our group plays, before we start out to play, we do not have any idea what the end result will be. Each player is free to contribute what he feels in the music at any given moment... our final results depend entirely on the musicianship, emotional make-up and taste of the individual member."

Reception

Writer A. B. Spellman commented: "this is a very disciplined group of musicians. They had complete intuition about where the other one was going to go. The sympathy within the group was absolutely extreme and that's hard to develop." He noted: "This record catches them just as they are sort of rising toward their peak. It has all the excitement and all the newness."

AllMusic's Steve Huey stated that the album showcases "a group that was growing ever more confident in its revolutionary approach and the chemistry in the bandmembers' interplay," and remarked: "Coleman was hitting his stride and finally letting out all the ideas and emotions that had previously been constrained by tradition. That vitality makes it an absolutely essential purchase and... some of the most brilliant work of Coleman's career."

C. Michael Bailey, writing for All About Jazz, called the title track "a wild phantasm of notes that are to 'free jazz' what trumpeter Dizzy Gillespie's 'Bebop' was for that virtuosic genre," and commented: "finally things are really beginning to come apart at the seams... Coleman has fully gained his traction and is now ready."

Track listing
All compositions by Ornette Coleman

Side one

Side two

Personnel
Ornette Coleman — alto saxophone
Don Cherry — pocket trumpet
Charlie Haden — bass
Billy Higgins — drums

References
Footnotes

Bibliography

External links 
 Change of the Century at Acclaimed Music (list of accolades)
 

1960 albums
Atlantic Records albums
Ornette Coleman albums
Albums produced by Nesuhi Ertegun